Malebranche may refer to:

 Andrée Malebranche (1916–2013), Haitian artist
 David Malebranche, Haitian-American physician
 Nicolas Malebranche, (1638–1715), French philosopher
 Malebranche (Divine Comedy), demons in the Dante's Inferno